Ungeremine is a betaine-type alkaloid isolated from Nerine bowdenii and related plants such as Pancratium maritimum.  Pharmacologically, it is of interest as an acetylcholinesterase inhibitor and accordingly as possibly relevant to Alzheimer's disease. It also has been investigated as a bactericide.

References

Acetylcholinesterase inhibitors
Quinoline alkaloids
Isoquinoline alkaloids
Bactericides
Phenols
Benzodioxoles